Echo School is a public high school in Echo, Oregon, United States.

Academics
In 2008, 91% of the school's seniors received their high school diploma. Of 22 students, 20 graduated, 1 dropped out, and 1 received a modified diploma.

References

High schools in Umatilla County, Oregon
Public elementary schools in Oregon
Public middle schools in Oregon
Public high schools in Oregon
Echo, Oregon